Phichit railway station is the main railway station of Phichit Province. Although it is a Class 1 Railway Station, the Nakhon Phing Express does not stop at this station. Phichit Station was built during King Chulalongkorn's reign, in Neo-Classical style.

Train services
 Local 407/408 Nakhon Sawan - Chiang Mai - Nakhon Sawan
 Local 401/402 Lop Buri - Phitsanulok - Lop Buri
 Rapid 111/108 Bangkok - Den Chai - Bangkok
 Ordinary 201/202 Bangkok - Phitsanulok - Bangkok
 Special Express 3/4 Bangkok - Sawankhalok/Sila At - Bangkok
 Rapid 109/102 Bangkok - Chiang Mai - Bangkok
 Special Express 13/14 Bangkok - Chiang Mai - Bangkok
 Rapid 105/106 Bangkok - Sila At -Bangkok
 Rapid 107/112 Bangkok - Den Chai -Bangkok
 Express 51/52 Bangkok - Chiang Mai -Bangkok
 Special Express Diesel Car No. 7/8 Bangkok - Chiang Mai - Bangkok

References
 
 

Railway stations in Thailand